Canachagala Lake is a lake east of Bisby Lodge in Herkimer County, New York. It drains northeast via Canachagala Brook which flows into the South Branch Moose River.

See also
 List of lakes in New York

References 

Lakes of New York (state)
Lakes of Herkimer County, New York